Sphodromantis citernii is a species of praying mantis found in Ethiopia and Somalia.

See also
African mantis
List of mantis genera and species

References

citernii
Mantodea of Africa
Insects of Ethiopia
Insects of Somalia
Insects described in 1917